Doonbeg GAA is a Gaelic Athletic Association club from the village of Doonbeg in County Clare, Ireland. 
The club only plays gaelic football, and have won the Clare Senior Football Championship on eighteen occasions.
They are the 2010 champions, having defeated Liscannor in the final by 0-11 to 0-7.

History
The club was founded in 1954 and won its first senior championship in 1955. On two occasions Doonbeg succeeded in recording a 3 in a row double (championship and league) 1967-68-69, and 1972-73-74. The club's greatest achievement was the winning of the 1998 Munster Club Championship, the first Clare club to capture this title. Padraig Gallagher led the side to defeat Moyle Rovers of Tipperary by 0-07 to 0-04. Another notable day for the club was Clare's 1992 Munster championship victory over Kerry in the Gaelic Grounds. Francis McInerney captained the team and with fellow Doonbeg clubmen, Gerry Killeen, Kieran O'Mahoney, Padraig Conway, Pat Blake and selector, Pat Hanrahan, playing a part in the win.

Major honours
 Munster Senior Club Football Championship (1): 1998
 Clare Senior Football Championship (18): 1955, 1961, 1967, 1968, 1969, 1972, 1973, 1974, 1982, 1983, 1988, 1991, 1995, 1996, 1998, 1999, 2001, 2010
 Clare Football League Div. 1 (Cusack Cup) (17): 1945 (as Clohanes), 1957, 1961, 1962, 1965, 1967, 1968, 1969, 1970, 1972, 1981, 1982, 1983, 1991, 1994, 1995, 1998
 Clare Intermediate Football Championship (2): 1945 (as Clohanes with Kilmurry-Ibrickane), 1949 (as Bealaha)
 Clare Junior A Football Championship (2): 1928, 1939
 Clare Under-21 A Football Championship (3): 1964, 1965, 1974

References

External links
Clare GAA Official Site
Doonbeg Club Crest

Gaelic games clubs in County Clare
Gaelic football clubs in County Clare